The Minnesota Moose were an American professional ice hockey team based out of Saint Paul, Minnesota that played in the International Hockey League from 1994 to 1996.

History
Following the departure of the National Hockey League's Minnesota North Stars in 1993, the state of Minnesota was left without a professional hockey team. To fill that void, the Minnesota Moose were founded the following year. The team began play in the IHL for the 1994–1995 season, using the Saint Paul Civic Center at its home arena, with some games in Minneapolis's Target Center.

After two years in the Twin Cities, the team was sold to a group of Canadian businessmen including Mark Chipman, who relocated the team to Winnipeg, Manitoba, and renamed them the Manitoba Moose. The franchise has played in the American Hockey League since the demise of the IHL in 2001 and is now the top minor league affiliate of the Winnipeg Jets, sharing the Canada Life Centre. The state of Minnesota welcomed a new NHL team, the Minnesota Wild, in 2000. The Wild play at the Xcel Energy Center, located on the site of the old Civic Center in St. Paul.

Season-by-season results

Team records 
Goals: 38 Dave Christian  (1994–95)
Assists: 81 Stephane Morin  (1994–95)
Points: 114 Stephane Morin  (1994–95)
Penalty minutes: 181 Brad Miller  (1994–95)
GAA: 3.31 Parris Duffus  (1995–96)
SV%: .895 Parris Duffus  (1995–96)
Career goals: 60 Stephane Morin 
Career assists: 132 Stephane Morin 
Career points: 192 Stephane Morin 
Career penalty minutes: 351 Brad Miller 
Career goaltending wins: 25 Tom Draper 
Career shutouts: 1 Tom Draper , Parris Duffus 
Career games: 161 Stephane Morin

Head coaches
 Frank Serratore (1994–1996)

References

External links 
 Minnesota Moose season statistics and records at The Internet Hockey Database

International Hockey League (1945–2001) teams
Sports in Minneapolis–Saint Paul
Ice hockey clubs established in 1994
Ice hockey teams in Minnesota
Ice hockey clubs disestablished in 1996
Ice hockey in Minnesota
Defunct ice hockey teams in Minnesota
1994 establishments in Minnesota
1996 disestablishments in Minnesota